Zafer Önen (1921 – 13 December 2013) was a Turkish film actor.

Filmography

 Ruhun Duymaz - 2004      
 Bayanlar Baylar - 2002      
 Hastayım Doktor - 2002   
 Canlı Hayat - 2000   
 Affet Bizi Hocam - 1998   
 Köşe Kapmaca - 1996   
 Tatlı Kaçıklar - 1996   
 Kuruntu Ailesi - 1986      
 Bir Kadın Bir Hayat - 1985   
 Sizin Dersane - 1980   
 Tanrıya Feryat - 1980   
 Babanın Kızları - 1979   
 Emekli Başkan - 1979   
 Bu Gece Bende Kal - 1979   
 Minnoş - 1979   
 Korkusuz Korkak - 1979      
 Oooh Oh - 1978   
 Eksik Etek - 1976   
 Güngörmüşler - 1976   
 Adamını Bul - 1975   
 Kadınım - 1975   
 Bekaret Kemeri - 1975   
 Gece Kuşu Zehra - 1975      
 Televizyon Çocuğu - 1975   
 Cici Kız - 1974      
 Mirasyediler - 1974      
 Hostes - 1974   
 Özleyiş - 1973   
 Elveda Meyhaneci - 1972   
 Çapkınlar Şahı - 1972   
 Solan Bir Yaprak Gibi - 1971   
 İki Ruhlu Kadın - 1971   
 Sevdiğim Uşak - 1971   
 Ayşecik Bahar Çiçeği - 1971   
 Gönül Hırsızı - 1971   
 Talihsiz Baba - 1970   
 Bütün Aşklar Tatlı Başlar - 1970   
 Tatlı Meleğim - 1970      
 Aşk Mabudesi - 1969   
 Ümit Dünyası - 1969   
 Sarmaşık Gülleri - 1968      
 Yaratılan Kadın - 1968   
 Kadın Düşmanı - 1967   
 Ayşecik Boş Beşik - 1965   
 Berduş Milyoner - 1965   
 Şehvetin Esiriyiz - 1965   
 Ateş Gibi Kadın - 1965   
 Acemi Çapkın - 1964   
 Karımın Sevgilisi - 1959   
 Fosforlu'nun Oyunu - 1959   
 Çileli Bülbül - 1957   
 Yaşlı Gözler - 1955   
 Curcuna - 1955

References

External links
 

1921 births
Turkish male film actors
Turkish male television actors
2013 deaths
Burials at Feriköy Cemetery